The 1935 Ole Miss Rebels football team was an American football team that represented the University of Mississippi in the Southeastern Conference during the 1935 college football season. In its sixth season under head coach Ed Walker, the team compiled a 9–3 record (3–1 against conference opponents) and was defeated by the Catholic University in the 1936 Orange Bowl.  The team played its home games at Vaught–Hemingway Stadium in Oxford, Mississippi.

Schedule

Roster
E Buster Poole, Jr.

References

Ole Miss
Ole Miss Rebels football seasons
Ole Miss Rebels football